Rudbeckia fulgida, the orange coneflower or perennial coneflower, is a species of flowering plant in the family Asteraceae, native to eastern North America.

Description

Growth and reproduction
Rudbeckia fulgida spreads by both stoloniferous stems and seed. The seeds are produced in fruits called cypselae, which are 2.2 to 4 mm long and have short coroniform pappi, 0.2 mm long.

The ripe seed is a favorite food of finches in winter.

Morphology
Stems are hairy, ridged, and dark green. Leaves are dark green, sparsely but roughly haired, simple, with sparsely serrate margins. Flowers are heads, with black disk florets and bright orange ray florets, borne singly on stems that extend above the foliage. Stems are glabrous or moderately covered in hirsute hairs with spreading branches. The leaves have blades that are lanceolate to broadly ovate or elliptic in shape without lobes. The leaf bases are attenuate to cordate in shape and the margins of the leaves are usually entire or serrate, or sometimes lacerate. The upper surfaces of the leaves are glabrous or have hirsute to strigose hairs.

The flower heads are often produced one per stem but are also often produced in corymbiform arrays with 2 to 7 flowers per stem. The cups that hold the flowers called receptacles, are hemispheric to ovoid in shape with paleae 2.5 to 4 mm long, the apices are obtuse to acute in shape with the ends usually glabrous and the apical margins ciliate. The flower heads have 10 to 15 ray florets with laminae elliptic to oblanceolate in shape and 15–25 cm long and 3 to 6 mm wide. The abaxially surfaces of the laminae have strigose hairs. The flower discs or center cones are 12 to 16 mm tall and 10 to 18 mm wide, made up of 50 to over 500 disc florets, with the corollas proximally yellowish green and brown-purple distally in color, 3 to 4.2 mm long, having style branches 1.3 mm long.

Etymology
The Latin specific epithet fulgida means "shining" or "glistening".

Cultivation
There are seven varieties;
 Rudbeckia fulgida var. deamii (S. F. Blake) Perdue - Deam's coneflower
 Rudbeckia fulgida var. fulgida Aiton - orange coneflower
 Rudbeckia fulgida var. palustris (Eggert ex C.L. Boynt. & Beadle) Perdue - orange coneflower, prairie coneflower
 Rudbeckia fulgida var. spathulata (Michx.) Perdue - orange coneflower
 Rudbeckia fulgida var. speciosa (Wender.) Perdue - orange coneflower
 Rudbeckia fulgida var. sullivantii (C.L. Boynt. & Beadle) Cronquist - Sullivant's coneflower
 Rudbeckia fulgida var. umbrosa (C.L. Boynt. & Beadle) Cronquist - orange coneflower

Rudbeckia fulgida var. deamii and R. fulgida var. sullivantii 'Goldsturm' have both gained the Royal Horticultural Society's Award of Garden Merit. 

Vernalization is beneficial to flower initiation.  Recommendations are listed below:
 'Goldsturm' - 10–12 weeks at 40 °F 
 'Little Goldstar' - 10 weeks below 40 °F 
 'Pot of Gold' - 10 weeks at 35-41 °F

References

fulgida
Flora of the Eastern United States
Plants described in 1789